The 1998–99 Nemzeti Bajnokság I, also known as NB I for short, was the 97th season of top-tier football in Hungary. The league is officially named Professzionális Nemzeti Bajnokság (PNB) for sponsorship reasons. The season began on 24 July 1998 and ended on the weekend 16 June 1999. Újpest are the defending champions, having won their 20th Hungarian championship at the end of the 1998–99 season.

Teams
Tiszakécskei FC, Előre FC Békéscsaba and Stadler FC finished the 1997–98 season in the bottom three places of the table and thus were relegated to their respective NB II divisions. Békéscsaba ended a 6-year and Stadler 4-year stay in the top league, while Tiszakécske were relegated after just one year in the league.

Stadium and locations

Personnel and kits

Note: Flags indicate national team as has been defined under FIFA eligibility rules. Players may hold more than one non-FIFA nationality.

Managerial changes

Overview
It was contested by 18 teams, and MTK Hungária FC won the championship.

League standings

Positions by round

Results

Statistical leaders

Top goalscorers

References
Hungary - List of final tables (RSSSF)
Soccerway
Futball-adattar

Nemzeti Bajnokság I seasons
1
Hungary